The 11th Los Angeles Film Critics Association Awards were announced on 14 December 1985 and given on 23 January 1986.

Winners
Best Picture:
Brazil
Runner-up: Out of Africa
Best Director:
Terry Gilliam – Brazil
Runner-up: Akira Kurosawa – Ran
Best Actor:
William Hurt – Kiss of the Spider Woman
Runner-up: Jack Nicholson – Prizzi's Honor
Best Actress:
Meryl Streep – Out of Africa
Runner-up: Whoopi Goldberg – The Color Purple
Best Supporting Actor:
John Gielgud – Plenty and The Shooting Party
Runner-up: William Hickey – Prizzi's Honor
Best Supporting Actress (tie):
Anjelica Huston – Prizzi's Honor
Runner-up: Oprah Winfrey – The Color Purple
Best Screenplay:
Terry Gilliam, Charles McKeown and Tom Stoppard - Brazil
Runner-up: Richard Condon and Janet Roach – Prizzi's Honor
Best Cinematography:
David Watkin – Out of Africa
Best Music Score:
Toru Takemitsu – Ran
Runner-up: Mark Isham - Trouble in Mind
Best Foreign Film (tie):
The Official Story (La historia oficial) • Argentina
Ran • Japan/France
Experimental/Independent Film/Video Award:
Rosa von Praunheim – Horror Vacui
New Generation Award:
Laura Dern
Runner-up: Whoopi Goldberg
Career Achievement Award:
Akira Kurosawa
Special Citation:
Claude Lanzmann - Shoah

References

External links
11th Annual Los Angeles Film Critics Association Awards

1985
Los Angeles Film Critics Association Awards
Los Angeles Film Critics Association Awards
Los Angeles Film Critics Association Awards
Los Angeles Film Critics Association Awards